The KhF-1 and KhF-2 bounding gas mines were Soviet landmines developed during World War II, though they were not deployed during the conflict. The mines would be triggered by an operator several hundred meters away, whereupon the mine bounded into the air and shattered projecting a chemical gas over an area of between 250 and 300 square meters.

Specifications
 Length: 345 mm
 Diameter: 150 mm
 Weight: 15 kg
 Warhead: 4.5 liter chemical

References
 
 

Land mines
Chemical weapon delivery systems
Weapons of the Soviet Union